MKNM: Mga Kwento ng Makata is the 6th overall (first in Universal Records Philippines) album by the Filipino rapper Gloc-9. It has 15 tracks including two bonus tracks: Hari ng Tondo featuring his protégé Denise Barbacena and Kung Tama S'ya featuring Jaq Dionisio of Kissjane.

Background and composition
“I have worked very hard for this album. Before, I would record albums for about two months. For MKNM: Mga Kwento Ng Makata, it took me around six months.” -Gloc-9

Track listing

Certifications

References 

Gloc-9 albums
2012 albums
Universal Records (Philippines) albums